Buck Curran (born May 23, 1967) is an American singer-songwriter-guitarist, record producer, painter and guitar maker.

Biography 
Curran formed the psych-folk duo Arborea in 2005 with partner Shanti Deschaine, with whom he recorded five albums and toured extensively throughout the United States and Europe between 2006 and 2015. Curran's music is associated with the Psychedelic Folk and Indie Folk genres, though his musical origins stem from performing traditional and original Blues and Folk in the 1990s. 
In 2009 he produced the benefit compilation Leaves of Life (2009), which included notable artists Devendra Benhart, Marissa Nadler, Alela Diane, etc. Curran also contributed to the renewal of interest in Robbie Basho producing two tribute albums, We Are All One in the Sun (2010) and Basket Full of Dragons (2016).
In the Winter of 2011/2012 The Fretboard Journal published a feature article on Robbie Basho (Voice of the Eagle) written by Curran for Issue 24. In 2019 he curated and produced a tribute to Jack Rose Ten Years Gone. The album was released on the December 5th, 2019 on the 10 year anniversary of Jack's passing.

In July 2016 he released his first solo record, Immortal Light, a split release between ESP-Disk and Obsolete Recordings. In 2018 Curran released his second album Morning Haikus, Afternoon Ragas. His third album 'No Love Is Sorrow' was released during lockdown in Bergamo, Italy which became the initial epicenter of the COVID-19 pandemic in Europe in the late winter and early spring of 2020. Curran was interviewed by Pitchfork in March 2020 at the beginning of the lockdown. On May 1 of  2020 he performed a 'Tiny Desk Home Concert' for NPR.

Curran is also an artist and painted the cover for Basket Full of Dragons. In July 2014 his paintings were part of a special exhibition in Denmark at the Fano Free Folk Festival, during which he also presented a special discussion on his spontaneous brushstroke technique using watercolors and improvisation in art. In 2017 his paintings were exhibited in Bergamo, Italy in December 2017 at InArteWerkkunst Gallery during the NOWART Exhibition. As well, he is a notable guitar maker who worked from 2002 to 2009 for renowned Maine luthier Dana Bourgeois, where he developed his own guitar model called Butterfly. His prototype for the Butterfly was included (alongside other notable luthiers from Maine: Dana Bourgeois, John Slobod, etc.) in the 'Player's Art': Guitar Exhibition at the Colby College Museum of Art May 7 thru July 17, 2005. Acoustic Guitar Magazine featured one of Curran's Butterfly guitars (made in 2006) for their 'Great Acoustics' article in their March 2012 issue. In 2017 Acoustic Guitar Magazine featured Curran's acoustic guitar instrumental 'River Unto Sea' in their June issue, followed by Curran's acoustic guitar instrumental 'Song for Liam' in their March/April 2019 issue. In the January/February 2022 issue of Acoustic Guitar featured Buck Curran's 'Long Lost 2009 Sobell Model 1' for their 'Great Acoustics' page. Guitar Magazine/String Letter Media also included Buck Curran's 'Song for Liam' in their new publication DADGAD Guitar Essentials(2022). In 2022 the Bert Jansch Foundation asked Buck to participate in 'For Bert Jansch: Around the World in 80 Plays', a special project featuring performance videos of select musicians playing  special 'Bert Jansch' Yamaha guitars that were sent around the world. Curran's video was filmed in historic Città Alta in Bergamo, Italy. Videos and artist pages have been published at Bert Jansch Foundation dot org.

Curran's acoustic and electric guitar playing is characterized by the extensive use of low alternate tunings, slide, Ebow, reverb, manipulating string overtones and dynamics creating haunting voice-like timbres on the instrument.

Discography

Albums 
 Immortal Light (2016, ESP-Disk/Obsolete Recordings)
 Morning Haikus, Afternoon Ragas (2018, ESP-Disk/Obsolete Recordings)
 No Love Is Sorrow (2020 Obsolete Recordings)

EPs 
 Standing Rock (2017, Obsolete Recordings)
 The Rushings feat. Buck Curran Nashville West Session (2016, Obsolete Recordings)
 Adele H feat. Buck Curran, Dogmas EP (2017, Obsolete Recordings)
 WFMU The Frow Show Live Session (Feat. Jodi Pedrali) (2021, Obsolete Recordings)

Compilation and other albums produced and curated by Buck Curran 
 Leaves of Life (2009, Darla Records)
 We Are All One, In The Sun: A Tribute to Robbie Basho (2010, Important Records/ 2011 alt.vinyl)
 Basket Full Of Dragons: A Tribute to Robbie Basho Vol 2 (2016, Obsolete Recordings)
 Robbie Basho: Live in Forli, Italy 1982 (2017, ESP-Disk/Obsolete Recordings)
 Ten Years Gone: A Tribute to Jack Rose (2019, Tompkins Square)
 Ten Years Gone: A Tribute to Jack Rose (2022, Obsolete Recordings - Digital Reissue w/extra tracks)

Records with Arborea 
 Wayfaring Summer (Summer Street, 2006)
 Arborea (Fire Museum, 2008)
 House of Sticks (Borne!/Darla, 2009)
 Red Planet (Strange Attractors Audio House, 2011)
 Fortress of the Sun (ESP-Disk, 2013)

References

External links 
 NPR Music, Buck Curran NPR Tiny Desk Home Concert, May 1, 2020
 Premier Guitar, Buck Curran's Transcendental Folk Guitar, March 24, 2020
 Acoustic Guitar Magazine, Buck Curran's Long Lost 2009 Sobell Model 1, December 15, 2021
 Acoustic Guitar Magazine, World Premiere: Learn to play Buck Curran's 'Song for Liam', January 28, 2019
 Pitchfork, A Working Guitarist in Italy's Hardest-Hit Coronavirus City Talks Life Under Lockdown, March 16, 2020
 Relix Magazine, Steve Gunn, William Tyler and Chris Forsyth on The New Golden Age of Guitar, by Jesse Jarnow on July 19, 2016
 Guitar Player, Buck Curran on Arborea's Avant-Folk Aesthetics, by Barry Cleveland, September 18, 2013
 NPR, Arborea Tiny Desk Concert, May 17, 2012
 Prog Magazine, Buck Curran - Immortal Light album review, February 15, 2017
 Folk Radio UK, Buck Curran Featured Interview, by Alex Gallacher, September 30, 2016
 Peghead Nation, Buck's Vinyl Solution, by Derk Richardson, January 3, 2017
 NOWART, NOWART Art Exhibition, by InArte Werkunst Gallery, December 1, 2017
 NPR, Tribute to Jack Rose, December 5, 2019
 Bert Jansch Foundation For Bert Jansch: Around the World in 80 Plays 'Buck Curran artist page', March, 2022

1967 births
Living people
American male guitarists
American male painters
American male singer-songwriters
Record producers from Florida
Guitar makers
American singer-songwriters